Lycaena xanthoides, the great copper, is a species of copper in the butterfly family Lycaenidae. It is found in North America.

Subspecies
These three subspecies belong to the species Lycaena xanthoides:
 Lycaena xanthoides nigromaculata J. Emmel & Pratt in T. Emmel, 1998
 Lycaena xanthoides obsolescens J. Emmel & Pratt in T. Emmel, 1998
 Lycaena xanthoides xanthoides (Boisduval, 1852)

References

Further reading

 

Lycaena
Articles created by Qbugbot
Butterflies described in 1852